The 29th Biathlon World Championships held in 1994 in Canmore, Alberta, Canada were only for the team events because these were not part of the Olympic programme in Lillehammer.

Men's results

Team event
Date: 20 March 1994.

Women's results

Team event

Medal table

References

1994
World Championships
International sports competitions hosted by Canada
1994 in Canadian sports
Biathlon competitions in Canada
1994 in Alberta
Sports competitions in Alberta
Canmore, Alberta
March 1994 sports events in Canada